The 2014 United States House of Representatives election in Vermont took place on November 4, 2014, to elect the U.S. representative from Vermont's at-large congressional district, who is currently representing the state of Vermont in the 114th United States Congress.

The election coincided with the election of the Governor of Vermont and other federal and state offices. Incumbent Democratic Congressman Peter Welch was re-elected to a fifth term in office.

Democratic primary

Candidates

Declared
 Peter Welch, incumbent representative

Results

Republican primary

Candidates

Declared
 Mark Donka, police officer, former member of the Hartford Board of Selectmen and nominee for the seat in 2012
 Donald W. Nolte
 Donald Russell

Results

Progressive primary

Results

Liberty Union primary

Candidates

Declared
 Matthew Andrews

Results

Independents

Candidates

Declared
 Cris Ericson, perennial candidate (also ran for Governor)
 Randall Meyer
 Jerry Trudell (Energy Independence), independent candidate for the seat in 2006 and 2008

General election

Results

References

External links
Mark Donka for U.S. Congress
Peter Welch for U.S. Congress
U.S. House elections in Vermont, 2014 at Ballotpedia
Campaign contributions at OpenSecrets

Vermont
2014
United States House